Ward 126 is a 2022 Indian Tamil-language romantic investigative thriller film written and directed by Selvakumar Chellapandian. The film was under Production House ssb talkies. The film stars Michael Thangadurai, Jishnu Menon, Shritha Sivadas, Vidya Pradeep, Chandini Tamilarasan, Shruthi Ramakrishnan. The film's music is composed by Varun Sunil with cinematography handled by SK Suresh Kumar and editing done by Thiyagu. The film was released in theatres on 22 July 2022.

Synopsis
A young man is found dead in his house, the story travels in a non-linear way while investigative shows darker side of the IT professionals,at last the murder to be solved becomes mystery.

Cast 

 Michael Thangadurai as Gokul / Krishna / Kannan
 Jishnu Menon as Jagadeesh
 Shritha Sivadas as Roseline "Rossie" Maria
 Vidya Pradeep as Yamini
 Shruthi Ramakrishnan as Swapna
 Chandini Tamilarasan as Vidhya
 Sonia Agarwal as Jyothisri
Umadevi
 Selvakumar Chellapandiyan as Shenbagaraj
 Sriman as Kannan's neighbour
 Nishanth 
 Vinod Sagar
 R. Amarendran
 Kalairani as Kannan's neighbour
 Deepa Shankar as Kannan's neighbour

Production 
On 25 December 2020 Jayam Ravi unveiled the first look poster. The film was shot in Chennai, Bangalore, and Noida, and the songs were shot in Pondicherry.

Music 
The film's soundtrack was composed by Varun Sunil. while lyrics are written by Uma Devi.

Release 
The film had a theatrical release on 22 July 2022. A critic from The Times of India noted that "Overall, Ward 126 is a decent watch and is engaging in parts". A reviewer from Thanthi TV gave the film a middling review. Film critic Malini Mannath wrote "Ward 126 is a promising effort from a maker, who is partly successful in his attempt to strike away from the formulaic scenario, both in terms of writing and narrative style".

References

External links 
 

2020s Tamil-language films